"Soy Peor" (English: "I'm Worse") is the single by Puerto Rican rapper Bad Bunny. It was originally released on December 8, 2016, through Rimas Entertainment as a standalone single. The song was written by Bunny and DJ Luian with the former handling the production. The song is credited as the establishment of Bad Bunny as the forerunner in the Latin American trap scene and reached number 19 on the Hot Latin Songs chart. A remix version of the song featuring J Balvin, Ozuna and Arcángel was released on June 22, 2017 with its music video released the following day.

Commercial performance
"Soy Peor" charted at the Hot Latin Songs chart at number 19 upon the issue date of September 2, 2017 and it also charted at number 48 where it stayed for 39 weeks.

Music video
The music video for "Soy Peor" was uploaded to YouTube on December 31, 2016.

Charts

Weekly charts

Year-end charts

Certifications

Release history

References

External links
 

2017 singles
Bad Bunny songs
Songs written by Bad Bunny
2016 songs